The Czech Republic national beach soccer team represents the Czech Republic in international beach soccer competitions and is controlled by the FAČR, the governing body for football in Czech Republic.

Current squad
Correct as of August 2013

Coach: Michael Lukič

Achievements
 FIFA Beach Soccer World Cup qualification (UEFA) Best: Quarter finals
 2008

References

External links
 
 Squad

European national beach soccer teams
National sports teams of the Czech Republic